Victoria Dam (Sinhala: වික්ටෝරියා වේල්ල Viktoriya Vella) is an arch dam located  upstream of the Mahaweli River's mouth and  from Teldeniya. It is named in honor of Her Majesty, Queen Victoria, Empress of the British Empire.

Its main purposes are irrigation and hydroelectric power production. It is the tallest dam in Sri Lanka, and supports a  power station, the largest hydroelectric power station in the country. Construction of the dam commenced in 1978 funded by aid granted by the United Kingdom under the patronage of Her Majesty, Queen Elizabeth II, and was completed during the time of President Junius Richard Jayewardene and was ceremonially opened by the Prime Minister of the United Kingdom, Margaret Thatcher.

History 
The Victoria Dam was constructed under the Accelerated Mahaweli Development Programme (AMDP). The project had been in planning for 30 years but was accelerated in 1977 to address economic difficulties within the country. The plan is designed to irrigate  of land and provide 600 MW of electricity. The Victoria Dam was originally proposed in 1964 after studies were completed by Canada's Huntings Technical Services and a team from the United Nations Development Program—Food and Agriculture Organization (UNDP-FAO). Construction of the dam was inaugurated on 14 August 1978, by the then-President Jayewardene with the implementation of the main structures beginning in 1980. Its completion was marked by a ceremony on 12 April 1985. Construction of the dam and tunnel was completed by the British Joint Venture of Balfour Beatty and Edmund Nuttall, while Costain Group carried out the construction of the power station. The consultant engineers on the project was Sir Alexander Gibb & Partners.  The dam resettled about 30,000 people — four times the estimate.

Dam and powerhouse 

The dam's gates, which need power only to close, won an award for "Innovative Design in Civil Engineering" by the Institution of Civil Engineers. Two additional low-level sluices at the base of the dam allows the purging of accumulated silts behind the dam.

Gallery

See also 

 List of dams and reservoirs in Sri Lanka
 List of power stations in Sri Lanka
 List of rivers in Sri Lanka
 Teldeniya (archaeological site)

References 

Dams in Sri Lanka
Hydroelectric power stations in Sri Lanka
Buildings and structures in Kandy District
Dams completed in 1985
Arch dams
1985 establishments in Sri Lanka